Balidan Stambh (Hindi: बलिदान स्तंभ "sacrificial pillar") is a memorial situated in Jammu in the Indian state of Jammu and Kashmir. It was constructed to commemorate the heroic deeds of the soldiers and policemen who sacrificed their lives in the fight to protect the sovereignty of the frontiers and during still ongoing Insurgency in Jammu and Kashmir. 
The country’s first of its kind was built by Indian Army at the cost of Rupees 130 million in 2009, sixty meters high in the shape of a soldier’s gun, the names of 4877 martyrs are inscribed on 52 pillars around the country, who died defending the motherland in five wars with Pakistan and China. Some of the pillars are dedicated to 543 soldiers who were martyred in the Kargil War. Of these martyrs, 71 were from different districts of Jammu and Kashmir.
Later, the personnel from military, paramilitary and police who laid down their lives during ongoing militancy in Jammu & Kashmir numbering to 15,000 were honored by inscribing their names in the memorial.

Architecture
The pillar is shaped like a bayoneted rifle and symbolises soldiers who went to war bravely. The rifle pointing to the sky is the centerpiece of this place. The height of the pillar is approximately 60 metres from the base with the sun rays filtering through its baffles. At the base is an eternal flame that symbolises the martyred soldiers, which have been made immortal by the virtue of their sacrifice for the nation. The martyrs flame is placed within the butt of the Rifle. The design of the memorial revolves around a 5.56 mm INSAS rifle, a standard issue for our troops. At the entrance, 6 metre tall INSAS bullets are erected on both sides. The memorial is exclusively dedicated to the soldiers martyred during wars and Counter Insurgency operations within Jammu and Kashmir region. A lot of pain staking effort has been undertaken to compile a exhaustive list of all martyrs of the Indo-Pakistani War of 1947-1948, Sino-Indian War of 1962, Indo-Pakistani War of 1965,Indo-Pakistani War of 1971, Kargil War of 1999 wars and the anti militancy operations which have been going on since 1990. These names are inscribed on pillars built around the circumference of the memorial as also on the walls around the Amar Jawan Jyoti. One half of the circumference has the Murals of Param Vir Chakra and Ashok Chakra awardees.

References

Monuments and memorials in India